Anacrusis rubida is a species of moth of the family Tortricidae. It is found in Ecuador.

The wingspan is about 14 mm for males and about 30 mm for females. The ground colour of the forewings of the males is orangish mixed with yellow in the distal area and suffused with rust brown at the base. The hindwings are dark brownish, but creamy yellowish in the terminal area. The ground colour of the forewings of the females is creamy brownish, strigulated (finely streaked) with brownish and with transverse browner lines. The hindwings are brownish.

Etymology
The species name refers to the colouration of the forewing and is derived from rubida (meaning red).

References

Moths described in 2004
Atteriini
Moths of South America
Taxa named by Józef Razowski